The Lebedev pistol is a Russian semi-automatic pistol, produced under Kalashnikov Concern and designed by Dmitry Lebedev. It was introduced in 2015 as PL-14 and later changed it designation as PL-15 in the year 2016.
, with a compact version of the pistol designated as PL-15K was introduced in the year 2017.

History
The PL-14 was first presented at the Army-2015 International Military-Technical Forum near Moscow, and its modernized version received the PL-15 index and was demonstrated a year later at the Army-2016 forum. The modified PL-15 and its shortened version with the PL-15K index were demonstrated at the similar Army-2017 forum. The  PL-15 is intended for use in the armed forces and law enforcement agencies as a replacement for the Makarov pistol, as well as a sporting pistol for competitions of various classes. In August 2020, it was reported that the state tests were complete for the RF Interior Ministry, and the general director of the Kalashnikov Concern, Dmitry Tarasov, said that the plant was being preparing for the production of the PL-15K compact version from 2021.  In March 2021, it was reported that the state tests of the Lebedev modular handgun were completed the past month for the RF National Guard, and the Kalashnikov Concern said that the plant was being preparing for the production of the pistol also from 2021. The Russian Ministry of Internal Affairs has adopted a new compact Lebedev pistol. The Kalashnikov firearms manufacturer is ready to launch the mass production.

Features
The PL-15 is a 9mm short recoil-operated, locked-breech handgun that uses a modified Browning cam-lock system similar to the one from the Browning Hi-Power pistol. The firearm's locking mechanism uses a linkless, vertically tilting barrel with a rectangular breech that locks into the ejection port cut-out in the slide.
  
It features a double-action only (DAO) trigger, requiring a long and heavy trigger pull that puts the hammer into a cocked state and then releases it with every shot. The trigger pull weight is 4 kg, and the full length of the trigger pull is 7 mm. It has a manual safety that, when engaged, disconnects the trigger from the hammer. All controls (manual safeties, slide release levers and magazine release buttons) are fully ambidextrous. A loaded chamber indicator is provided in the form of a pin that protrudes from the back of the slide when a round is present in the chamber. The PL-15-01 and PL-15K-01 variants of the pistol are striker-fired and have a single-action trigger with a significantly reduced trigger pull weight and length.

Cartridges are fed from proprietary detachable double-stack single-feed magazines. It features removable front and rear dovetail sight posts, completely interchangeable with sights designed for Glock pistols. The frame features a picatinny rail underneath the barrel for the attachment of accessories. The PL-15 pistol can be equipped with an extended, threaded barrel, intended for installing a supressor.

See also
MR-443 Grach (PYa)
Udav

References

Semi-automatic pistols of Russia
9mm Parabellum semi-automatic pistols